Between Waves is the fourth studio album by Portuguese pop–rock singer David Fonseca. It was released in Portugal in November, 2nd, 2009. David Fonseca wrote all the songs and played or arranged most of the instruments. The first single, A Cry 4 Love, was available online more than a month before the actual album.

Track listing

2009 albums
David Fonseca albums